Sulphide Lake is located in North Cascades National Park, in the U. S. state of Washington. Sulphide Lake lies in a cirque on the southeast slopes of Mount Shuksan. Several major cascades drop as much as  into Sulphide Lake including Sulphide Basin Falls which is from melt off the Sulphide Glacier. After Sulphide Creek drains from Sulphide lake, it then plunges at least  over a series of cascades called Sulphide Creek Falls, which is one of the tallest waterfalls in the U.S.

The lake is in a basin with near vertical walls and the rock is phyllite and greenschist. Above the lake on the cliffs below Crystal Glacier a 0.3 mile wide band stained red in color (from iron oxide) is exposed that runs for about 2.5 miles. This band is rich in the iron sulfides pyrite and pyrrhotite. Presumably this is the source of the lake's name.

References

Lakes of Washington (state)
North Cascades National Park
Lakes of Whatcom County, Washington